You're Hired may refer to:
 You're Hired (TV series), a 2009 Hong Kong comedy series
 The Apprentice: You're Hired!, the final episode of The Apprentice: You're Fired!